Jeffrey Glenn Bennett (born October 2, 1962) is an American voice actor who voiced Johnny Bravo in the eponymous television series, Dexter's Dad in Dexter's Laboratory, Brooklyn in Gargoyles and Kowalski in the Penguins of Madagascar series (replacing Chris Miller). In 2012, Bennett was awarded an Annie Award for his role in The Penguins of Madagascar and in 2016, he was awarded an Emmy Award for his role in Transformers: Rescue Bots. He has been listed among the top names in the voice-over field.

Early life
Bennett was born in 1962, in Houston, Texas. He got his acting training on the stage at the Alley Theatre in Houston, before moving to California with his family in 1990.

Career
Bennett's first role in the voice-over industry was Horace "I.Q." Boothroyd the Third in James Bond Jr..

Afterwards, more roles came which included Brooklyn in Gargoyles, Petrie in The Land Before Time series from the second film onward (replacing the late Will Ryan), Jitters A. Dog in Bonkers, Lord Camembert in Biker Mice from Mars, Roger Dearly, Lieutenant Pug and several others on 101 Dalmatians: The Series, and Dexter's Dad in Dexter's Laboratory.

In 1995, he played what would be his best-known role, the title character in Johnny Bravo and Johnny Bravo and the Amazon Women in The What a Cartoon Show!. For the character, Bennett used an Elvis Presley impersonation, which was somewhere between the young and the older Presley. In 1997, Johnny Bravo was made into a television series. A cult hit show, it continued from 1997 to 2004, receiving praise and multiple Annie Award nominations, including one for Bennett.

He has also provided various voices in the animated series Freakazoid!, voicing characters such as The Huntsman, Cave Guy, Candle Jack, Lord Bravery, and many others.

Later, he did the voices of Drixenol "Drix" Koldriliff in Ozzy and Drix (replacing David Hyde Pierce), Clay Bailey on Xiaolin Showdown, Mister Boss and Mister Fizz in Codename: Kids Next Door, Raj on Camp Lazlo, Principal Luna and Jan Rongetes (janitor and Swedish air guitarist) on Class of 3000, Azmuth in Ben 10 Alien Force and Ben 10: Ultimate Alien, Smee and Bones on Jake and the Never Land Pirates.

Since 2006, Bennett has voiced the role of Peppermint Larry in the television show The Marvelous Misadventures of Flapjack 2008-2010. The Man With the Yellow Hat and also voices neighborhood farmer Mr. Renkins in the PBS Kids TV series Curious George. The series was awarded Daytime Emmys for Outstanding Children's Animated Program in 2008, 2010 and 2012.

Bennett has also done the voices of the Joker and other characters on Batman: The Brave and the Bold, Dorkus in Planet Sheen, several characters (Keswick, Larry and Ollie) on T.U.F.F. Puppy, Red Tornado on Young Justice, and Kowalski, Chuck Charles and the team's computer in The Penguins of Madagascar.

In 2012, he was awarded the Annie Award for Outstanding Individual Achievement for Voice Acting in a Television Production for his role as Kowalski. He was also nominated for a Daytime Emmy Award  for Outstanding Performer in an Animated Program, but lost to June Foray.

In 2016, Bennett won the Daytime Emmy Award for Outstanding Performer in an Animated Program for his performance as Mayor Lusky on Transformers: Rescue Bots.

Personal life
Bennett has been married to Susan E. Welby since 1988 and has one daughter born in 1998. A legal separation was filed in 2016, but they later reconciled.

Filmography

Film

Animation

Anime

Video games

Live-action

AudioBooks

Other

Awards and nominations

References

External links

 
 
 
 
 

1962 births
Living people
20th-century American comedians
20th-century American male actors
21st-century American comedians
21st-century American male actors
Male actors from Houston
American impressionists (entertainers)
American male stage actors
American male video game actors
American male voice actors
Annie Award winners
Audiobook narrators
Cartoon Network people
Daytime Emmy Award winners
Disney people